Triple M The Border (official callsign: 2BDR) is a commercial radio station owned and operated by Southern Cross Austereo as part of the Triple M network. The station is broadcast to townships along the New South Wales/Victoria border from studios in Albury.

The station commenced broadcasting in 1998 as The River. On 15 December 2016, the station was relaunched as Triple M.

References

External links

Mainstream rock radio stations in Australia
Radio stations established in 1998
Radio stations in New South Wales
Radio stations in Victoria
1998 establishments in Australia